The Communauté de communes du Bassin de Neufchâteau is a former administrative association of mostly rural communes in the Vosges département of eastern France and in the region of Lorraine. It was merged into the new Communauté de communes de l'Ouest Vosgien in January 2017.

Created in November 2012, the community of communes had its administrative offices at Neufchâteau. It had a population of 17,700 inhabitants.

Composition
The Communauté de communes comprised the following communes:

Neufchâteau'''
Avranville
Autreville
Autigny-la-Tour
Bazoilles-sur-Meuse
Brechainville
Certilleux
Circourt-sur-Mouzon
Chermisey
Clérey-la-Côte
Coussey
Domrémy-la-Pucelle
Fréville
Frebécourt
Grand
Greux
Harmonville
Jubainville
Jainvillotte
Landaville
Lemmecourt
Liffol-le-Petit
Liffol-le-Grand
Martigny-les-Gerbonvaux
Maxey-sur-Meuse
Mont-lès-Neufchâteau
Midrevaux
Moncel-sur-Vair
Pargny-sous-Mureau
Punerot
Pompierre
Rebeuville
Rollainville
Ruppes
Seraumont
Soulosse-sous-Saint-Élophe
Sionne
Sartes
Tilleux
Tranqueville-Graux
Trampot
Villouxel

History
Since 15 December 2012, the Community of Communes of the Neufchâteau Region includes 42 municipalities and towns. It is the result of the merger of three old communities of communes (Pays de Neufchâteau / Pays de Jeanne / Pays des Côtes et de la Ruppe)

Responsibilities 
The objective of the Community of Commues of the Neufchâteau Region is to pursue shared objectives and pool administrative resources in respect of the following policy areas:

 Management of public spaces
 Economic development
 Environment
 "Quality of life" policy
 Tourism development
 Infrastructure development
 Culture, sport and school equipments
 Early childhood supervision
 Creation of a geographical information system (GIS)
 Creation of onshore wind farm development areas

References

External links
 Official website
 Visit Neufchâteau and its surroundings

Neufchateau